Langa kaXaba (? – circa 1805) was the King of the Ndwandwe nation. In the Nguni language, "Langa" means "sun" or "day" and "kaXaba" means "son of Xaba". He was the father and predecessor of King Zwide kaLanga, the rival to King Shaka kaSenzangakhona.

Year of death uncertain
Ndwandwe people
Year of birth missing
1805 deaths